Progressive familial intrahepatic cholestasis (PFIC) is a group of familial cholestatic conditions caused by defects in biliary epithelial transporters.  The clinical presentation usually occurs first in childhood with progressive cholestasis. This usually leads to failure to thrive, cirrhosis, and the need for liver transplantation.

Types
Types of progressive familial intrahepatic cholestasis are as follows:
 Type 1 (OMIM #211600), also called Byler disease
 Type 2 (OMIM #601847), also called ABCB11 deficiency or BSEP deficiency
 Type 3 (OMIM #602347), also called ABCB4 deficiency or MDR3 deficiency
 Type 4 (OMIM #615878), from mutation in TJP2

Signs and symptoms
The onset of the disease is usually before age 2, but patients have been diagnosed with PFIC even into adolescence.  Of the three entities, PFIC-1 usually presents earliest.  Patients usually present in early childhood with cholestasis, jaundice, and failure to thrive.  Intense pruritus is characteristic; in patients who present in adolescence, it has been linked with suicide.  Patients may have fat malabsorption, leading to fat soluble vitamin deficiency, and complications, including osteopenia.

Pathogenesis

PFIC-1 is caused by a variety of mutations in ATP8B1, a gene coding for a P-type ATPase protein, FIC-1, that is responsible for phospholipid translocation across membranes.  It was previously identified as clinical entities known as Byler's disease and Greenland-Eskimo familial cholestasis.  Patients with PFIC-1 may also have watery diarrhea, in addition to the clinical features below, due to FIC-1's expression in the intestine.  How ATP8B1 mutation leads to cholestasis is not yet well understood.

PFIC-2 is caused by a variety of mutations in ABCB11, the gene that codes for the bile salt export pump, or BSEP.  Retention of bile salts within hepatocytes, which are the only cell type to express BSEP, causes hepatocellular damage and cholestasis.

PFIC-3 is caused by a variety of mutations in ABCB4, the gene encoding multidrug resistance protein 3 (MDR3), which codes for a floppase responsible for phosphatidylcholine translocation.  The defective phosphatidylcholine translocation leads to a lack of phosphatidylcholine in bile.  Phosphatidylcholine normally chaperones bile acids, preventing damage to the biliary epithelium.  The free or "unchaperoned" bile acids in bile of patients with MDR3 deficiency cause a cholangitis.  Biochemically, this is of note, as PFIC-3 is associated with a markedly elevated GGT.

The inheritance pattern of all three forms of PFIC defined to date is autosomal recessive.

Liver biopsies typically show evidence of cholestasis (including bile plugs and bile infarcts), duct hypoplasia, hepatocellular injury, and Zone 3 fibrosis.  Giant cell change and other features of hepatocellular injury are more pronounced in PFIC-2 than in PFIC-1 or PFIC-3.  End-stage disease in all forms of PFIC defined to date is characterized by bridging fibrosis with duct proliferation in peri-portal regions.

Diagnosis
Biochemical markers include a normal GGT for PFIC-1 and -2, with a markedly elevated GGT for PFIC-3.  Serum bile acid levels are grossly elevated.  Serum cholesterol levels are typically not elevated, as is seen usually in cholestasis, as the pathology is due to a transporter as opposed to an anatomical problem with biliary cells.

Treatment
Initial treatment is supportive, with the use of agents to treat cholestasis and pruritus, including the following:
 Ursodeoxycholic acid
 Cholestyramine
 Rifampin
 Naloxone, in refractory cases

The partial external biliary diversion (PEBD) procedure is a surgical approach that diverts bile from the gallbladder externally into an ileostomy bag.

Patients should be supplemented with fat-soluble vitamins, and occasionally medium-chain triglycerides in order to improve growth. When liver synthetic dysfunction is significant, patients should be listed for transplantation.  Family members should be tested for PFIC mutations, in order to determine risk of transmission.

Prognosis
The disease is typically progressive, leading to fulminant liver failure and death in childhood, in the absence of liver transplantation. Hepatocellular carcinoma may develop in PFIC-2 at a very early age; even toddlers have been affected.

Epidemiology
 Consanguinity is believed to be a major risk factor.
 Similar transport protein mutations are believed to pose a higher risk for intrahepatic cholestasis of pregnancy.

See also
 Alagille syndrome
 Intrahepatic cholestasis of pregnancy
 Liver transplantation

References

External links 
  GeneReview/NIH/UW entry on Low γ-GT Familial Intrahepatic Cholestasis
 OMIM entry on CHOLESTASIS, PROGRESSIVE FAMILIAL INTRAHEPATIC, 1; PFIC1

Diseases of liver
Congenital disorders
Membrane transport protein disorders
Hepatology